The 2017–18 season was Shrewsbury Town's 132nd year in existence and their third consecutive season in League One after finishing in 18th place the previous season. Shrewsbury finished third in the League and qualified for the EFL League One play-offs. They reached the play-off final after beating Charlton Athletic in the semi-final, but they were beaten by Rotherham United. Paul Hurst left his role as manager at the end of the season.

The club also participated in the FA Cup, the EFL Cup and the EFL Trophy.

The season covers the period from 1 July 2017 to 30 June 2018.

Transfers

Transfers in

Transfers out

Loans in

Loans out

New contracts & contract extensions

Pre-season

Friendlies
In addition to a behind closed doors fixture against Ebbsfleet United played in Portugal, Shrewsbury Town announced six pre-season friendlies, against Aston Villa, Wolverhampton Wanderers, Burton Albion, AFC Telford United, Cardiff City and Brackley Town. In lieu of a reserve team, Salop also announced their intention to organise friendly fixtures throughout the regular season, the first such fixture being against Walsall.

Competitions

League One

League table

Results summary

Results by matchday

Matches

League One play-offs

FA Cup

EFL Cup
On 16 June 2017, Shrewsbury Town were drawn away to Nottingham Forest in the first round.

EFL Trophy

On 12 July 2017, the group stage draw was complete with Shrewsbury facing Coventry City, Walsall and West Bromwich Albion U23s. After finishing as runners-up, Shrewsbury were drawn away in the second round against Port Vale. A home tie against Blackpool was confirmed for the third round.

Player statistics

Squad statistics

As of match played 27 May 2018.

|-
|colspan="14"|Players who left the club before the season ended:

|-
|}

Top scorers

As of match played 27 May 2018.

Clean sheets
As of match played 27 May 2018.

Disciplinary record
As of match played 27 May 2018.

Note: Two yellow cards in one match is counted as one red card.

References

Shrewsbury Town
Shrewsbury Town F.C. seasons